National monuments of Singapore are sites, buildings and structures in Singapore that have been designated by the National Heritage Board (NHB) as being of special historic, traditional, archaeological, architectural or artistic value. For historical significance (World War II, self-independence of Singapore, transformation and the oldest memories of the structure), these buildings are not allowed to be demolished. The Preservation of Monuments Act gives the board authority to order the preservation of such sites and promote research and public interest in the monuments.

The NHB is a statutory board within the Government of Singapore, under the jurisdiction of the Ministry of Culture, Community and Youth, and it has so far gazetted 82 sites, buildings and structures as national monuments. The latest addition to the list is Padang.

List of national monuments

References

External links

Official website of the Preservation of Sites and Monuments of the National Heritage Board
List of national monuments on the Roots.Sg portal of the National Heritage Board
Singapore's National Monuments – National Library Singapore Resource Guides

 
Monuments
Heritage registers in Singapore
Singapore